Konstantinos "Dinos" Nikolopoulos (born 30 November 1993) is a Greek professional footballer who plays as a left back for Super League 2 club Rodos.

Career
He started his career in 2010–11 season from Olympiakos Lampetiou, an amateur football club in Labeti, Pyrgos, Greece. In July 2011, he was moved to Paniliakos youth ranks. He promoted to the first team on July 7, 2011 at the age of 18. At Paniliakos he made 13 appearances, scoring 1 goal. On August 18, 2012 he moved to AEK Athens to play both for U20 and the first team.

References

External links
  Soccerway Profile
Statistics and profile at myplayer.gr (in Greek)

1993 births
Living people
Greek footballers
Association football defenders
Super League Greece players
Paniliakos F.C. players
AEK Athens F.C. players
A.P.S. Zakynthos players
AO Chania F.C. players
Rodos F.C. players
Footballers from Pyrgos, Elis